William Ittner Orr (1919–2001) was an engineer, educator, communicator, and ham radio operator. He was the American author of numerous amateur radio and radio engineering texts. He is best known as the author of The W6SAI Antenna Handbook and fondly remembered for the 1959 Radio Handbook.

Early life and education
Orr grew up in New York, where he was an only child.  His father took little interest in him and did not encourage him in activities that involved other children. Orr's mother encouraged his early interest in amateur radio. Orr taught himself morse code, and in his early teens held the amateur license of W2HCE, later changing to W6SAI.

After earning his degree in electrical engineering from the University of California at Berkeley, he was hired to work on innovative radar systems for combat airplanes during WWII.

After the war Orr was involved in engineering for the tube manufacturer Eitel-McCullogh (EIMAC). In addition, to working for EIMAC, Orr penned columns for the CQ Magazine and Ham Radio Magazine. His application notes for EIMAC tubes were favorite reading for amateur radio home builders worldwide.

He was active in amateur radio throughout his life. A well known DXer and a DXCCHonor Roll member, he also conducted a few personal DXing epeditions to exotic locations like Monaco, St. Pierre, and Miquelon.

Project "OSCAR"
In early 1960, William Orr joined a group of radio amateurs (mostly electronic engineers) working to launch a private satellite. By 1962 they had created "OSCAR" (Orbiting Satellite Carrying Amateur Radio) at a total cost of $63.47. "OSCAR" beat out the $50 million Telstar by seven months for the honor of being the world's first privately owned satellite.

Personal life and death
Orr married Natalie McCrone; after the war ended they moved to Menlo Park, California, where they raised six children together.

Orr died in his sleep, then aged 81, on January 24, 2001. He was survived by five daughters, one son, and four grandsons.

Writing style and bibliography
Orr had the ability to use simple plain language in writing about technical subjects in a way that attracted amateurs who had an interest in the topic but lacked a technical background in the area.  

Over a period of 40 years Orr wrote and edited scores of technical books and articles of interest to Amateur Radio enthusiasts. His topics ranged from basic electronic theory to microwave communications to the theory, design and construction of antennas.

His titles include:

See also
 Cubical quad antenna

References

Amateur radio people
1919 births
2001 deaths
People from New York (state)